Pixie Polite is a drag performer most known for competing on series 4 of RuPaul's Drag Race UK.

Career 
Pixie Polite competed on series 4 of RuPaul's Drag Race UK. On the first episode, "Pixie paid homage to BBC comedy Only Fools and Horses in a drag outfit inspired by Del Boy, with a second look inspired by clouds and rays of sunshine." For Snatch Game, she impersonated Shirley Bassey. Pixie Polite eliminated Dakota Schiffer from the competition, and ultimately placed fifth in the semi-finals. Following Drag Race, she toured with her fellow series 4 contestants.

Pixie Polite released her debut single "Give It To Ya" in 2022. The track received a music video.

Personal life 
Pixie Polite is from Brighton. Pixie Polite dated Tia Kofi for approximately five years; both were members of the group The Vixens. Pixie Polite uses he/they pronouns out of drag and she/her pronouns in drag.

Discography

Singles
 "Give It to Ya" (2022)

Filmography

Television
RuPaul's Drag Race UK (series 4)

References

Living people
British drag queens
People from Brighton
RuPaul's Drag Race UK contestants